Nimgul is a small village in the state of Maharashtra, India. It is located in the Sindkheda taluka of Dhule District.

Location
It is located on the bank of the Tapi River and the Ahirani language is mostly used by villagers.

See also
 Dhule City
 Dhule District
 List of villages in Dhule District
 List of districts of Maharashtra
 Maharashtra

External links
 Census Of India: 2001: Census Data for Nimgul Village - Code 110200
 Government of India: Ministry of Panchayati Raj

References

Villages in Dhule district